= Kitts, Kentucky =

Unincorporated community in Kentucky, United States

- Unincorporated community
- Location within Kentucky Location within the United States
- Coordinates: 36°51′21″N 83°17′43″W
- Country: United States
- State: Kentucky
- County: Harlan
- Elevation: 1,247 ft (380 m)
- Time zone: UTC-6 (Central (CST))
  - Summer (DST): UTC-5 (CST)
- GNIS feature ID: 495824

Kitts is an unincorporated community and coal town in Harlan County, Kentucky, United States. Its post office is closed.
